The Duchess of Portland refers to the wife or widow of a Duke of Portland, a former title in the peerage of Great Britain. The title was created in 1716 but became extinct in 1990 upon the death of the ninth Duke.

Duchesses of Portland
 Margaret Bentinck, Duchess of Portland (née Lady Margaret Harley) (1715–1785), British aristocrat, wife of William Bentinck, 2nd Duke of Portland
 Dorothy Bentinck, Duchess of Portland (née Lady Dorothy Cavendish) (1750–1794), wife of William Cavendish-Bentinck, 3rd Duke of Portland
 Henrietta Bentinck, Duchess of Portland (née Henrietta Scott) (1774–1844), wife of William Bentinck, 4th Duke of Portland
 Winifred Cavendish-Bentinck, Duchess of Portland (née Winifred Dallas-Yorke) (1863–1954), British humanitarian and animal rights activist, wife of William Cavendish-Bentinck, 6th Duke of Portland
 Ivy Cavendish-Bentinck, Duchess of Portland (née Ivy Gordon-Lennox) (1887–1982), founder of the Harley Gallery and Foundation, wife of William Cavendish-Bentinck, 7th Duke of Portland